Fairton is a town in the Ashburton District, New Zealand. According to the 2001 New Zealand census it had a population of 1185, of which 612 were male and 573 were female.

The Newlands School house, opened near Rangiora in 1880, was moved to Fairton in 1901. The school moved to a new location donated by a local business in 1968.

Marae

Hakatere Marae has occupied the original Fairton School building on State Highway 1 since 1970, two years after the school left the site. It held Waitangi Day events from 1973, and incorporated a hangi into the annual holiday from 1974. The land was officially purchased by the Mid Canterbury Māori Committee in 1975.

The marae is named after the nearby Ashburton River.

The original school house and wharenui (meeting house) was destroyed by fire in 2003.

A new $300,000 wharekai (dining hall) was completed in 2007, the entranceway was widened in 2008, and a new multi-use conference building was completed in 2009.

The Ministry of Health granted the marae $10,000 a year from 2009 to 2012 to develop a community marae garden on a half acre of land.

Ashburton carver Vince Leonard completed carvings for the meeting house and Ashburton College until his death in 2019.

In October 2020, the Government committed $110,208 from the Provincial Growth Fund to renovate the marae, creating 14 jobs.

References 

Ashburton District
Populated places in Canterbury, New Zealand